Saf Minal (Hindi: सफ मिनाल) is a mountain of Garhwal Himalaya in Uttarakhand India. Saf Minal standing majestically at 6911 meter 22674 feet. It's the 21st highest located entirely within the uttrakhand India. Nanda Devi, is the highest mountain in this category and 50th highest peak in India. Saf Minal is the 332nd highest peak in the world. Saf Minal falls on the edge of the Northern Nanda Devi National Park.

Climbing history

Saf Minal (6911m) lies on the outer rim of the Nanda Devi sanctuary and just west of Rishi Pahar. The first ascent by Himalayan Alpine Association of Japan in 1975 through the south east ridge from inside the Nanda Devi National Park. On 2 October, J. Imai and A. Hagiwara reached the summit after 8 hour of climbing at 1.30 p.m.
The second ascent came in on October 5, 2004 by an American-British team Ian Parnel and John Varco (US) climbed the northwest face of Saf Minal this is the first ascent of the northwest face of Saf Minal.

Glaciers and rivers

It is surrounded by Glaciers on both the side Uttari Rishi Glacier, on the southern side and Bagini Glacier on the northern side. The River from Bagini Glacier met with Dhauli Ganga at Jumma. Changabang Bamak (Glacier) and Uttari Rishi Bamak (Glacier) also met Dhauli Ganga through Rishi Ganga gorge. later Dhauli Ganga met with Alaknanda river at Vishnu Prayag two main tributaries of Ganga. These two main rivers meet at Devprayag and became Ganga thereafter.

The entire surrounding area are protected within the  Nanda Devi National Park or Nanda Devi Biosphere Reserve which is a World Heritage Site declared by UNESCO . The Nanda Devi National Park is home to several world-class treks.

Neighboring peaks
neighboring peaks of Kalanka: 
 Nanda Devi: 
 Dunagiri: 
 Rishi Pahar: 
 Kalanka: 
 Changabang:

See also

 List of Himalayan peaks of Uttarakhand
 Gangotri National Park
 Nanda Devi National Park

References

Mountains of Uttarakhand
Six-thousanders of the Himalayas
Geography of Chamoli district